Darron Asher Collins (born 1970) is an American human ecologist and academic administrator specialized in ethnobotany. He became president of the College of the Atlantic in 2011.

Life 
Collins is from Morris Plains, New Jersey. His grandmother, Josephine Collins (née Flynn), was born in County Roscommon and immigrated to Morristown, New Jersey in May 1928. Collins was raised in nearby Parsippany–Troy Hills, New Jersey and graduated from Parsippany Hills High School in 1988. He was awarded a Barry M. Goldwater Scholarship and graduated from College of the Atlantic in 1992. Collins completed a master's degree in Latin American Studies and a Ph.D. in anthropology at Tulane University. During his studies, he researched ethnobotany in Guatemala and became passably adequate in Spanish and Qʼeqchiʼ language. His 2001 dissertation was titled From Woods to Weeds: Cultural and Ecological Transformations in Alta Verapaz, Guatemala.

Collins worked for the World Wide Fund for Nature for ten years, ending as the managing director of creative assets. He became president of the College of the Atlantic in 2011. Collins is the first COA alumni to hold the position.

Collins is married and has two daughters. Preceding 2011, Collins resided in Decatur, Georgia.

References 

1970 births
Living people
College of the Atlantic alumni
Tulane University alumni
American ecologists
Parsippany Hills High School alumni
People from Morris Plains, New Jersey
People from Parsippany-Troy Hills, New Jersey
Scientists from New Jersey
College of the Atlantic faculty
Human ecologists
Ethnobotanists
American anthropologists
21st-century American biologists
American people of Irish descent